Clydesdale West is one of the 20 electoral wards of South Lanarkshire Council. Created in 2007, the ward elects four councillors using the single transferable vote electoral system and covers an area with a population of 19,350 people.

The ward has produced strong results for both the Scottish National Party (SNP) and Labour. Initially, the SNP held half the seats in the ward before swinging towards Labour which has held half the seats since 2012.

Boundaries
The ward was created following the Fourth Statutory Reviews of Electoral Arrangements ahead of the 2007 Scottish local elections. As a result of the Local Governance (Scotland) Act 2004, local elections in Scotland would use the single transferable vote electoral system from 2007 onwards so Clydesdale West was formed from an amalgamation of several previous first-past-the-post wards. It contained part of the former Clyde Valley and Forth wards as well as all of the former Carluke/Crawforddyke, Carluke/Whitehill and Law/Carluke wards. Clydesdale West covers an area in the north of South Lanarkshire next to its boundary with North Lanarkshire Council and takes in a rural area surrounding the town of Carluke including the villages of Braidwood, Crossford and Law. Following the Fifth Statutory Reviews of Electoral Arrangements ahead of the 2017 Scottish local elections, the ward's boundaries were not changed.

Councillors

Election results

2022 election

2017 election

2012 election

2007 election

Notes

References

Wards of South Lanarkshire
Clydesdale
Carluke